Howard 'Butch' Kerzner was a South African businessman and the son of Sol Kerzner.

He was born in Durban and went to school in Johannesburg. He was sent to Stanford University where he completed a  master's degree in business administration.

He later joined his father's business, Kerzner International, and became its CEO in 2003, leading it on an expansion drive.
Donald Trump, a hotelier, called him "a great visionary".

He was killed in a helicopter crash in the Dominican Republic while surveying sites for new resorts.

References

1964 births
2006 deaths
South African business executives
Stanford University alumni
People from Durban